The McDonnell Douglas/Boeing C-17 Globemaster III is a large military transport aircraft that was developed for the United States Air Force (USAF) from the 1980s to the early 1990s by McDonnell Douglas. The C-17 carries forward the name of two previous piston-engined military cargo aircraft, the Douglas C-74 Globemaster and the Douglas C-124 Globemaster II.

The C-17 is based upon the YC-15, a smaller prototype airlifter designed during the 1970s. It was designed to replace the Lockheed C-141 Starlifter, and also fulfill some of the duties of the Lockheed C-5 Galaxy. Compared to the YC-15, the redesigned airlifter differed in having swept wings, increased size, and more powerful engines. Development was protracted by a series of design issues, causing the company to incur a loss of nearly US$1.5 billion on the program's development phase. On 15 September 1991, roughly one year behind schedule, the first C-17 performed its maiden flight. The C-17 formally entered USAF service on 17 January 1995. Boeing, which merged with McDonnell Douglas in 1997, continued to manufacture the C-17 for almost two decades. The final C-17 was completed at the Long Beach, California plant and flown on 29 November 2015.

The C-17 commonly performs tactical and strategic airlift missions, transporting troops and cargo throughout the world; additional roles include medical evacuation and airdrop duties. The transport is in service with the USAF along with air arms of India, the United Kingdom, Australia, Canada, Qatar, the United Arab Emirates, Kuwait, and the Europe-based multilateral organization Heavy Airlift Wing. The type played a key logistical role during both Operation Enduring Freedom in Afghanistan and Operation Iraqi Freedom in Iraq, as well as in providing humanitarian aid in the aftermath of various natural disasters, including the 2010 Haiti earthquake and the 2011 Sindh floods.

Development

Background and design phase
In the 1970s, the U.S. Air Force began looking for a replacement for its Lockheed C-130 Hercules tactical cargo aircraft. The Advanced Medium STOL Transport (AMST) competition was held, with Boeing proposing the YC-14, and McDonnell Douglas proposing the YC-15. Though both entrants exceeded specified requirements, the AMST competition was canceled before a winner was selected. The USAF started the C-X program in November 1979 to develop a larger AMST with longer range to augment its strategic airlift.

By 1980, the USAF had a large fleet of aging C-141 Starlifter cargo aircraft. Compounding matters, increased strategic airlift capabilities was needed to fulfill its rapid-deployment airlift requirements. The USAF set mission requirements and released a request for proposals (RFP) for C-X in October 1980. McDonnell Douglas chose to develop a new aircraft based on the YC-15. Boeing bid an enlarged three-engine version of its AMST YC-14. Lockheed submitted both a C-5-based design and an enlarged C-141 design. On 28 August 1981, McDonnell Douglas was chosen to build its proposal, then designated C-17. Compared to the YC-15, the new aircraft differed in having swept wings, increased size, and more powerful engines. This would allow it to perform the work done by the C-141, and to fulfill some of the duties of the Lockheed C-5 Galaxy, freeing the C-5 fleet for outsize cargo.

Alternative proposals were pursued to fill airlift needs after the C-X contest. These were lengthening of C-141As into C-141Bs, ordering more C-5s, continued purchases of KC-10s, and expansion of the Civil Reserve Air Fleet. Limited budgets reduced program funding, requiring a delay of four years. During this time contracts were awarded for preliminary design work and for the completion of engine certification. In December 1985, a full-scale development contract was awarded, under Program Manager Bob Clepper. At this time, first flight was planned for 1990. The USAF had formed a requirement for 210 aircraft.

Development problems and limited funding caused delays in the late 1980s. Criticisms were made of the developing aircraft and questions were raised about more cost-effective alternatives during this time. In April 1990, Secretary of Defense Dick Cheney reduced the order from 210 to 120 aircraft. The maiden flight of the C-17 took place on 15 September 1991 from the McDonnell Douglas's plant in Long Beach, California, about a year behind schedule. The first aircraft (T-1) and five more production models (P1-P5) participated in extensive flight testing and evaluation at Edwards Air Force Base. Two complete airframes were built for static and repeated load testing.

Development difficulties
A static test of the C-17 wing in October 1992 resulted in its failure at 128% of design limit load, below the 150% requirement. Both wings buckled rear to the front and failures occurred in stringers, spars, and ribs. Some $100 million were spent to redesign the wing structure; the wing failed at 145% during a second test in September 1993. A review of the test data, however, showed that the wing was not loaded correctly and did indeed meet the requirement. The C-17 received the "Globemaster III" name in early 1993. In late 1993, the Department of Defense (DoD) gave the contractor two years to solve production issues and cost overruns or face the contract's termination after the delivery of the 40th aircraft. By accepting the 1993 terms, McDonnell Douglas incurred a loss of nearly US$1.5 billion on the program's development phase.

In March 1994, the Non-Developmental Airlift Aircraft program was established to procure a transport aircraft using commercial practices as a possible alternative or supplement to the C-17. Initial material solutions considered included: buy a modified Boeing 747-400 NDAA, restart the C-5 production line, extend the C-141 service life, and continue C-17 production. The field eventually narrowed to: the Boeing 747-400, the Lockheed Martin C-5D, and the McDonnell Douglas C-17. The NDAA program was initiated after the C-17 program was temporarily capped at a 40-aircraft buy pending further evaluation of C-17 cost and performance and an assessment of commercial airlift alternatives.

In April 1994, the program remained over budget and did not meet weight, fuel burn, payload, and range specifications. It failed several key criteria during airworthiness evaluation tests. Problems were found with the mission software, landing gear, and other areas. In May 1994, it was proposed to cut production to as few as 32 aircraft; these cuts were later rescinded. A July 1994 Government Accountability Office (GAO) report revealed that USAF and DoD studies from 1986 and 1991 stated the C-17 could use 6,400 more runways outside the U.S. than the C-5, but these studies had only considered runway dimensions, but not runway strength or load classification numbers (LCN). The C-5 has a lower LCN, but the USAF classifies both in the same broad load classification group. When considering runway dimensions and load ratings, the C-17's worldwide runway advantage over the C-5 shrank from 6,400 to 911 airfields. The report also stated "current military doctrine that does not reflect the use of small, austere airfields", thus the C-17's short field capability was not considered.

A January 1995 GAO report stated that the USAF originally planned to order 210 C-17s at a cost of $41.8 billion, and that the 120 aircraft on order were to cost $39.5 billion based on a 1992 estimate. In March 1994, the U.S. Army decided it did not need the  low-altitude parachute-extraction system delivery with the C-17 and that the C-130's  capability was sufficient. C-17 testing was limited to this lower weight. Airflow issues prevented the C-17 from meeting airdrop requirements. The YC-15 was transferred to AMARC to be made flightworthy again for further flight tests for the C-17 program in March 1997.

By September 1995, most of the prior issues were reportedly resolved and the C-17 was meeting all performance and reliability targets. The first USAF squadron was declared operational in January 1995.

Production and deliveries

In 1996, the DoD ordered another 80 aircraft for a total of 120. In 1997, McDonnell Douglas merged with domestic competitor Boeing. In April 1999, Boeing offered to cut the C-17's unit price if the USAF bought 60 more; in August 2002, the order was increased to 180 aircraft. In 2007, 190 C-17s were on order for the USAF. On 6 February 2009, Boeing was awarded a $2.95 billion contract for 15 additional C-17s, increasing the total USAF fleet to 205 and extending production from August 2009 to August 2010. On 6 April 2009, U.S. Secretary of Defense Robert Gates stated that there would be no more C-17s ordered beyond the 205 planned. However, on 12 June 2009, the House Armed Services Air and Land Forces Subcommittee added a further 17 C-17s.

In 2010, Boeing reduced the production rate to 10 aircraft per year from a high of 16 per year, due to dwindling orders and to extend the production line's life while additional orders were sought. The workforce was reduced by about 1,100 through 2012, a second shift at the Long Beach plant was also eliminated. By April 2011, 230 production C-17s had been delivered, including 210 to the USAF. The C-17 prototype "T-1" was retired in 2012 after use as a testbed by the USAF. In January 2010, the USAF announced the end of Boeing's performance-based logistics contracts to maintain the type. On 19 June 2012, the USAF ordered its 224th and final C-17 to replace one that crashed in Alaska in July 2010.

In September 2013, Boeing announced that C-17 production was starting to close down. In October 2014, the main wing spar of the 279th and last aircraft was completed; this C-17 was delivered in 2015, after which Boeing closed the Long Beach plant. Production of spare components was to continue until at least 2017. The C-17 is projected to be in service for several decades. In February 2014, Boeing was engaged in sales talks with "five or six" countries for the remaining 15 C-17s; thus Boeing decided to build ten aircraft without confirmed buyers in anticipation of future purchases.

In May 2015, The Wall Street Journal reported that Boeing expected to book a charge of under $100 million and cut 3,000 positions associated with the C-17 program, and also suggested that Airbus' lower cost A400M Atlas took international sales away from the C-17.

Sources: C-17 Globemaster III Pocket Guide, Boeing IDS Major Deliveries

Design

The C-17 Globemaster III is a strategic transport aircraft, able to airlift cargo close to a battle area. The size and weight of U.S. mechanized firepower and equipment have grown in recent decades from increased air mobility requirements, particularly for large or heavy non-palletized outsize cargo.

The C-17 is powered by four Pratt & Whitney F117-PW-100 turbofan engines, which are based on the commercial Pratt & Whitney PW2040 used on the Boeing 757. The engine's thrust reversers direct engine exhaust air upwards and forward, reducing the chances of foreign object damage by ingestion of runway debris, and providing enough reverse thrust to back up the aircraft while taxiing. The thrust reversers can also be used in flight at idle-reverse for added drag in maximum-rate descents. In vortex surfing tests performed by two C-17s, up to 10% fuel savings were reported.

For cargo operations the C-17 requires a crew of three: pilot, copilot, and loadmaster. The cargo floor has rollers for palletized cargo but it can be flipped to provide a flat floor suitable for vehicles and other rolling stock. Cargo is loaded through a large aft ramp that accommodates rolling stock, such as a 69-ton (63-metric ton) M1 Abrams main battle tank, other armored vehicles, trucks, and trailers, along with palletized cargo.

Boeing informally calls these aircraft the C-17 ER. It is designed to airdrop 102 paratroopers and their equipment. According to Boeing the maximum unloaded range is 6,230 nautical miles (10,026 Kilometers).

The C-17 can also operate from unpaved, unimproved runways (although with a higher probability to damage the aircraft). The thrust reversers can be used to move the aircraft backwards and reverse direction on narrow taxiways using a three- (or more) point turn. The plane is designed for 20 man-hours of maintenance per flight hour, and a 74% mission availability rate.

Operational history

United States Air Force

The first production C-17 was delivered to Charleston Air Force Base, South Carolina, on 14 July 1993. The first C-17 unit, the 17th Airlift Squadron, became operationally ready on 17 January 1995. It has broken 22 records for oversized payloads. The C-17 was awarded U.S. aviation's most prestigious award, the Collier Trophy, in 1994. A Congressional report on operations in Kosovo and Operation Allied Force noted "One of the great success stories...was the performance of the Air Force's C-17A" It flew half of the strategic airlift missions in the operation, the type could use small airfields, easing operations; rapid turnaround times also led to efficient utilization.

In 2006, eight C-17s were delivered to March Joint Air Reserve Base, California; controlled by the Air Force Reserve Command (AFRC), assigned to the 452d Air Mobility Wing and subsequently assigned to AMC's 436th Airlift Wing and its AFRC "associate" unit, the 512th Airlift Wing, at Dover Air Force Base, Delaware, supplementing the Lockheed C-5 Galaxy. The Mississippi Air National Guard's 172 Airlift Group received their first of eight C-17s in 2006. In 2011, the New York Air National Guard's 105th Airlift Wing at Stewart Air National Guard Base transitioned from the C-5 to the C-17.

C-17s delivered military supplies during Operation Enduring Freedom in Afghanistan and Operation Iraqi Freedom in Iraq as well as humanitarian aid in the aftermath of the 2010 Haiti earthquake, and the 2011 Sindh floods, delivering thousands of food rations, tons of medical and emergency supplies. On 26 March 2003, 15 USAF C-17s participated in the biggest combat airdrop since the United States invasion of Panama in December 1989: the night-time airdrop of 1,000 paratroopers from the 173rd Airborne Brigade occurred over Bashur, Iraq. These airdrops were followed by C-17s ferrying M1 Abrams, M2 Bradleys, M113s and artillery. USAF C-17s have also assisted allies in their airlift needs, such as Canadian vehicles to Afghanistan in 2003 and Australian forces for the Australian-led military deployment to East Timor in 2006. In 2006, USAF C-17s flew 15 Canadian Leopard C2 tanks from Kyrgyzstan into Kandahar in support of NATO's Afghanistan mission. In 2013, five USAF C-17s supported French operations in Mali, operating with other nations' C-17s (RAF, NATO and RCAF deployed a single C-17 each).

Since 1999, C-17s have flown annually to Antarctica on Operation Deep Freeze in support of the US Antarctic Research Program, replacing the C-141s used in prior years. The initial flight was flown by the USAF 62nd Airlift Wing. The C-17s fly round trip between Christchurch Airport and McMurdo Station around October each year and take 5 hours to fly each way. In 2006, the C-17 flew its first Antarctic airdrop mission, delivering 70 000 pounds of supplies. Further air drops occurred during subsequent years.

A C-17 accompanies the President of the United States on his visits to both domestic and foreign arrangements, consultations, and meetings. It is used to transport the Presidential Limousine, Marine One, and security detachments. On several occasions, a C-17 has been used to transport the President himself, temporarily gaining the Air Force One call sign while doing so.

Debate arose over follow-on C-17 orders, the USAF requested line shutdown while Congress called for further production. In FY2007, the USAF requested $1.6 billion in response to "excessive combat use" on the C-17 fleet. In 2008, USAF General Arthur Lichte, Commander of Air Mobility Command, indicated before a House of Representatives subcommittee on air and land forces a need to extend production to another 15 aircraft to increase the total to 205, and that C-17 production may continue to satisfy airlift requirements. The USAF finally decided to cap its C-17 fleet at 223 aircraft; the final delivery was on 12 September 2013.

In 2015, as part of a missile-defense test at Wake Island, simulated medium-range ballistic missiles were launched from C-17s against THAAD missile defense systems and the USS John Paul Jones (DDG-53). In early 2020, palletized munitions–"Combat Expendable Platforms"– were tested from C-17s and C-130Js with results the USAF considered positive. Future anticipated improvements includes support for JDAM-ER, mine laying, drone dispersal as well as improved standoff range when full production of the  JASSM-XR delivers large inventories in 2024.

On 15 August 2021, USAF C-17 02-1109 from the 62nd Airlift Wing and 446th Airlift Wing at Joint Base Lewis-McChord departed Hamid Karzai International Airport in Kabul, Afghanistan, while crowds of people trying to escape the 2021 Taliban offensive ran alongside the aircraft. The C-17 lifted off with people holding on to the outside, and at least two died after falling from the aircraft. There were an unknown number possibly crushed and killed by the landing gear retracting, with human remains found in the landing-gear stowage. Also that day, C-17 01-0186 from the 816th Expeditionary Airlift Squadron at Al Udeid Air Base transported 823 Afghan citizens from Hamid Karzai International Airport on a single flight, setting a new record for the type which was previously over 670 people during a 2013 typhoon evacuation from Tacloban, Philippines.

Royal Air Force
Boeing marketed the C-17 to many European nations including Belgium, Germany, France, Italy, Spain and the United Kingdom. The Royal Air Force (RAF) has established an aim of having interoperability and some weapons and capabilities commonality with the USAF. The 1998 Strategic Defence Review identified a requirement for a strategic airlifter. The Short-Term Strategic Airlift competition commenced in September of that year, but the tender was canceled in August 1999 with some bids identified by ministers as too expensive, including the Boeing/BAe C-17 bid, and others unsuitable. The project continued, with the C-17 seen as the favorite. In the light of Airbus A400M delays, the UK Secretary of State for Defence, Geoff Hoon, announced in May 2000 that the RAF would lease four C-17s at an annual cost of £100 million from Boeing for an initial seven years with an optional two-year extension. The RAF had the option to buy or return the aircraft to Boeing. The UK committed to upgrading its C-17s in line with the USAF so that if they were returned, the USAF could adopt them. The lease agreement restricted the C-17's operational use, meaning that the RAF could not use them for para-drop, airdrop, rough field, low-level operations and air to air refueling.

The first C-17 was delivered to the RAF at Boeing's Long Beach facility on 17 May 2001 and flown to RAF Brize Norton by a crew from No. 99 Squadron. The RAF's fourth C-17 was delivered on 24 August 2001. The RAF aircraft were some of the first to take advantage of the new center wing fuel tank found in Block 13 aircraft. In RAF service, the C-17 has not been given an official service name and designation (for example, C-130J referred to as Hercules C4 or C5), but is referred to simply as the C-17 or "C-17A Globemaster". Although it was to be a fallback for the A400M, the Ministry of Defence (MoD) announced on 21 July 2004 that they had elected to buy their four C-17s at the end of the lease, though the A400M appeared to be closer to production. The C-17 gives the RAF strategic capabilities that it would not wish to lose, for example a maximum payload of  compared to the A400M's . The C-17's capabilities allow the RAF to use it as an airborne hospital for medical evacuation missions.

Another C-17 was ordered in August 2006, and delivered on 22 February 2008. The four leased C-17s were to be purchased later in 2008. Due to fears that the A400M may suffer further delays, the MoD announced in 2006 that it planned to acquire three more C-17s, for a total of eight, with delivery in 2009–2010. On 3 December 2007, the MoD announced a contract for a sixth C-17, which was received on 11 June 2008. On 18 December 2009, Boeing confirmed that the RAF had ordered a seventh C-17, which was delivered on 16 November 2010. The UK announced the purchase of its eighth C-17 in February 2012. The RAF showed interest in buying a ninth C-17 in November 2013.

On 13 January 2013, the RAF deployed two C-17s from RAF Brize Norton to the French Évreux Air Base, transporting French armored vehicles to the Malian capital of Bamako during the French intervention in Mali. In June 2015, an RAF C-17 was used to medically evacuate four victims of the 2015 Sousse attacks from Tunisia.  On 13 September 2022, C-17 ZZ177 carried the body of Queen Elizabeth II from Edinburgh Airport to RAF Northolt in London. She had been lying in state at St Giles' Cathedral in Edinburgh, Scotland.

Royal Australian Air Force

The Royal Australian Air Force (RAAF) began investigating an acquisition of strategic transport aircraft in 2005. In late 2005, the then Minister for Defence Robert Hill stated that such aircraft were being considered due to the limited availability of strategic airlift aircraft from partner nations and air freight companies. The C-17 was considered to be favored over the A400M as it was a "proven aircraft" and in production. One major RAAF requirement was the ability to airlift the Army's M1 Abrams tanks; another requirement was immediate delivery. Though unstated, commonality with the USAF and the RAF was also considered advantageous. RAAF aircraft were ordered directly from the USAF production run and are identical to American C-17s even in paint scheme, the only difference being the national markings, allowing deliveries to commence within nine months of commitment to the program.

On 2 March 2006, the Australian government announced the purchase of three aircraft and one option with an entry into service date of 2006. Australia also signed a US$80.7M contract to join the global 'virtual fleet' C-17 sustainment program; RAAF C-17s receive the same upgrades as the USAF's fleet.

The RAAF took delivery of its first C-17 in a ceremony at Boeing's plant at Long Beach, California on 28 November 2006. Several days later the aircraft flew from Hickam Air Force Base, Hawaii to Defence Establishment Fairbairn, Canberra, arriving on 4 December 2006. The aircraft was formally accepted in a ceremony at Fairbairn shortly after arrival. The second aircraft was delivered to the RAAF on 11 May 2007 and the third was delivered on 18 December 2007. The fourth Australian C-17 was delivered on 19 January 2008. All the Australian C-17s are operated by No. 36 Squadron and are based at RAAF Base Amberley in Queensland.

On 18 April 2011, Boeing announced that Australia had signed an agreement with the U.S. government to acquire a fifth C-17 due to an increased demand for humanitarian and disaster relief missions. The aircraft was delivered to the RAAF on 14 September 2011. On 23 September 2011, Australian Minister for Defence Materiel Jason Clare announced that the government was seeking information from the U.S. about the price and delivery schedule for a sixth Globemaster. In November 2011, Australia requested a sixth C-17 through the U.S. Foreign Military Sales program; it was ordered in June 2012, and was delivered on 1 November 2012.

In August 2014, Defence Minister David Johnston announced the intention to purchase one or two additional C-17s. The United States Congress approved the sale under the Foreign Military Sales program. Prime Minister Tony Abbott confirmed in April 2015 that two additional aircraft were to be ordered, with both delivered by 4 November 2015; these added to the six C-17s it had .

Royal Canadian Air Force

The Canadian Forces had a long-standing need for strategic airlift for military and humanitarian operations around the world. It had followed a pattern similar to the German Air Force in leasing Antonovs and Ilyushins for many requirements, including deploying the Disaster Assistance Response Team to tsunami-stricken Sri Lanka in 2005; the Canadian Forces had relied entirely on leased An-124 Ruslan for a Canadian Army deployment to Haiti in 2003. A combination of leased Ruslans, Ilyushins and USAF C-17s was also used to move heavy equipment to Afghanistan. In 2002, the Canadian Forces Future Strategic Airlifter Project began to study alternatives, including long-term leasing arrangements.

On 5 July 2006, the Canadian government issued a notice of intent to negotiate with Boeing to procure four airlifters for the Canadian Forces Air Command (Royal Canadian Air Force after August 2011). On 1 February 2007, Canada awarded a contract for four C-17s with delivery beginning in August 2007. Like Australia, Canada was granted airframes originally slated for the USAF to accelerate delivery. The official Canadian designation is CC-177 Globemaster III.

On 23 July 2007, the first Canadian C-17 made its initial flight. It was turned over to Canada on 8 August, and participated at the Abbotsford International Airshow on 11 August prior to arriving at its new home base at 8 Wing, CFB Trenton, Ontario on 12 August. Its first operational mission was to deliver disaster relief to Jamaica following Hurricane Dean that month. The last of the initial four aircraft was delivered in April 2008. On 19 December 2014, it was reported that Canada intended to purchase one more C-17. On 30 March 2015, Canada's fifth C-17 arrived at CFB Trenton. The aircraft are assigned to 429 Transport Squadron based at CFB Trenton.

On 14 April 2010, a Canadian C-17 landed for the first time at CFS Alert, the world's most northerly airport. Canadian Globemasters have been deployed in support of numerous missions worldwide, including Operation Hestia after the earthquake in Haiti, providing airlift as part of Operation Mobile and support to the Canadian mission in Afghanistan. After Typhoon Haiyan hit the Philippines in 2013, Canadian C-17s established an air bridge between the two nations, deploying Canada's DART and delivering humanitarian supplies and equipment. In 2014, they supported Operation Reassurance and Operation Impact.

Strategic Airlift Capability program

At the 2006 Farnborough Airshow, a number of NATO member nations signed a letter of intent to jointly purchase and operate several C-17s within the Strategic Airlift Capability (SAC). SAC members are Bulgaria, Estonia, Hungary, Lithuania, the Netherlands, Norway, Poland, Romania, Slovenia, the U.S., along with two Partnership for Peace countries Finland and Sweden as of 2010. The purchase was for two C-17s, and a third was contributed by the U.S. On 14 July 2009, Boeing delivered the first C-17 under the SAC program. The second and third C-17s were delivered in September and October 2009.

The SAC C-17s are based at Pápa Air Base, Hungary. The Heavy Airlift Wing is hosted by Hungary, which acts as the flag nation. The aircraft are manned in similar fashion as the NATO E-3 AWACS aircraft. The C-17 flight crew are multi-national, but each mission is assigned to an individual member nation based on the SAC's annual flight hour share agreement. The NATO Airlift Management Programme Office (NAMPO) provides management and support for the Heavy Airlift Wing. NAMPO is a part of the NATO Support Agency (NSPA). In September 2014, Boeing stated that the three C-17s supporting SAC missions had achieved a readiness rate of nearly 94 percent over the last five years and supported over 1,000 missions.

Indian Air Force
In June 2009, the Indian Air Force (IAF) selected the C-17 for its Very Heavy Lift Transport Aircraft requirement to replace several types of transport aircraft. In January 2010, India requested 10 C-17s through the U.S.'s Foreign Military Sales program, the sale was approved by Congress in June 2010. On 23 June 2010, the IAF successfully test-landed a USAF C-17 at the Gaggal Airport, India to complete the IAF's C-17 trials. In February 2011, the IAF and Boeing agreed terms for the order of 10 C-17s with an option for six more; the US$4.1 billion order was approved by the Indian Cabinet Committee on Security on 6 June 2011. Deliveries began in June 2013 and were to continue to 2014. In 2012, the IAF reportedly finalized plans to buy six more C-17s in its five-year plan for 2017–2022.

The C-17s are based at Hindon Air Force Station and are operated by No. 81 Squadron IAF Skylords. The first C-17 was delivered in January 2013 for testing and training; it was officially accepted on 11 June 2013. The second C-17 was delivered on 23 July 2013 and put into service immediately. IAF Chief of Air Staff Norman AK Browne called it "a major component in the IAF's modernization drive" while taking delivery of the aircraft at Boeing's Long Beach factory. On 2 September 2013, the Skylords squadron with three C-17s officially entered IAF service.

The Skylords regularly fly missions within India, such as to high-altitude bases at Leh and Thoise. The IAF first used the C-17 to transport an infantry battalion's equipment to Port Blair on Andaman Islands on 1 July 2013. Foreign deployments to date include Tajikistan in August 2013, and Rwanda to support Indian peacekeepers. One C-17 was used for transporting relief materials during Cyclone Phailin.

The sixth aircraft was received in July 2014. In June 2017, the U.S. Department of State approved the potential sale of one C-17 to India under a proposed $366 million U.S. Foreign Military Sale. This aircraft, the last C-17 produced, increased the IAF's fleet to 11 C-17s. In March 2018, a contract was awarded for completion by 22 August 2019.

Qatar 

Boeing delivered Qatar's first C-17 on 11 August 2009 and the second on 10 September 2009 for the Qatar Emiri Air Force. Qatar received its third C-17 in 2012, and fourth C-17 was received on 10 December 2012. In June 2013, The New York Times reported that Qatar was allegedly using its C-17s to ship weapons from Libya to the Syrian opposition during the civil war via Turkey. On 15 June 2015, it was announced at the Paris Airshow that Qatar agreed to order four additional C-17s from the five remaining "white tail" C-17s to double Qatar's C-17 fleet. One Qatari C-17 bears the civilian markings of government-owned Qatar Airways, although the airplane is owned and operated by the Qatar Emiri Air Force. This is because some airports are closed to airplanes with military markings.

United Arab Emirates 
In February 2009, the United Arab Emirates Air Force agreed to buy four C-17s. In January 2010, a contract was signed for six C-17s. In May 2011, the first C-17 was handed over and the final was received in June 2012.

Kuwait

Kuwait requested the purchase of one C-17 in September 2010 and a second in April 2013 through the U.S.'s Foreign Military Sales (FMS) program. The nation ordered two C-17s; the first was delivered on 13 February 2014.

Proposed operators 
In 2015, New Zealand's Minister of Defence, Gerry Brownlee was considering the purchase of two C-17s for the Royal New Zealand Air Force at an estimated cost of $600 million as a heavy air transport option. However, the New Zealand Government eventually decided not to acquire the C-17.

Variants
C-17A: Initial military airlifter version.
C-17A "ER": Unofficial name for C-17As with extended range due to the addition of the center wing tank. This upgrade was incorporated in production beginning in 2001 with Block 13 aircraft.
Block 16: This software/hardware upgrade was a major improvement of the improved Onboard Inert Gas-Generating System (OBIGGS II), a new weather radar, an improved stabilizer strut system and other avionics.
Block 21: Adds ADS-B capability, IFF modification, communication/navigation upgrades and improved flight management.
C-17B: A proposed tactical airlifter version with double-slotted flaps, an additional main landing gear on the center fuselage, more powerful engines, and other systems for shorter landing and take-off distances. Boeing offered the C-17B to the U.S. military in 2007 for carrying the Army's Future Combat Systems (FCS) vehicles and other equipment.
KC-17: Proposed tanker variant of the C-17.
MD-17: Proposed variant for US airlines participating in the Civil Reserve Air Fleet, later redesignated as BC-17 after 1997 merger.

Operators

 Royal Australian Air Force – 8 C-17A ERs in service as of Jan. 2018.
 No. 36 Squadron

 Royal Canadian Air Force – 5 CC-177 (C-17A ER) aircraft in use as of Jan. 2018.
 429 Transport Squadron, CFB Trenton

 Indian Air Force – 11 C-17s as of Aug. 2019.
No. 81 Squadron (Skylords), Hindon AFS

 Kuwait Air Force – 2 C-17s as of Jan. 2018
Europe
 The multi-nation Strategic Airlift Capability Heavy Airlift Wing – 3 C-17s in service as of Jan. 2018, including 1 C-17 contributed by the USAF; based at Pápa Air Base, Hungary.

Qatar Emiri Air Force – 8 C-17As in use as of Jan. 2018

United Arab Emirates Air Force – 8 C-17As in operation as of Jan. 2018

 Royal Air Force – 8 C-17A ERs in use as of Jan. 2018
 No. 99 Squadron, RAF Brize Norton

 United States Air Force – 222 C-17s in service  (157 Active, 47 Air National Guard, 18 Air Force Reserve)
60th Air Mobility Wing – Travis Air Force Base, California
21st Airlift Squadron
62d Airlift Wing – McChord AFB, Washington
4th Airlift Squadron
7th Airlift Squadron
8th Airlift Squadron
 10th Airlift Squadron - (2003–2016)
305th Air Mobility Wing – McGuire Air Force Base, New Jersey
6th Airlift Squadron
385th Air Expeditionary Group – Al Udeid Air Base, Qatar
816th Expeditionary Airlift Squadron
436th Airlift Wing – Dover Air Force Base, Delaware
3d Airlift Squadron
437th Airlift Wing – Charleston Air Force Base, South Carolina
14th Airlift Squadron
15th Airlift Squadron
16th Airlift Squadron
17th Airlift Squadron - (1993–2015)
3d Wing – Elmendorf Air Force Base, Alaska
517th Airlift Squadron (Associate)
15th Wing – Hickam Air Force Base, Hawaii
535th Airlift Squadron
97th Air Mobility Wing – Altus AFB, Oklahoma
58th Airlift Squadron
412th Test Wing – Edwards AFB, California
418th Flight Test Squadron
Air Force Reserve
315th Airlift Wing (Associate) – Charleston AFB, South Carolina
300th Airlift Squadron
317th Airlift Squadron
701st Airlift Squadron
349th Air Mobility Wing (Associate) – Travis AFB, California
301st Airlift Squadron
445th Airlift Wing – Wright-Patterson AFB, Ohio
89th Airlift Squadron
446th Airlift Wing (Associate) – McChord AFB, Washington
97th Airlift Squadron
313th Airlift Squadron
728th Airlift Squadron
452d Air Mobility Wing – March ARB, California
729th Airlift Squadron
507th Air Refueling Wing – Tinker AFB, Oklahoma
730th Air Mobility Training Squadron (Altus AFB)
512th Airlift Wing (Associate) – Dover AFB, Delaware
326th Airlift Squadron
514th Air Mobility Wing (Associate) – McGuire AFB, New Jersey
732d Airlift Squadron
911th Airlift Wing – Pittsburgh Air Reserve Station, Pennsylvania
758th Airlift Squadron
Air National Guard
105th Airlift Wing – Stewart ANGB, New York
137th Airlift Squadron
145th Airlift Wing – Charlotte Air National Guard Base, North Carolina
156th Airlift Squadron
154th Wing – Hickam AFB, Hawaii
204th Airlift Squadron (Associate)
164th Airlift Wing – Memphis ANGB, Tennessee
155th Airlift Squadron
167th Airlift Wing – Shepherd Field ANGB, West Virginia
167th Airlift Squadron
172d Airlift Wing – Allen C. Thompson Field ANGB, Mississippi
183d Airlift Squadron
176th Wing – Elmendorf AFB, Alaska
144th Airlift Squadron

Accidents and notable incidents 

 On 10 September 1998, a USAF C-17 (AF Serial No.96-0006) delivered Keiko the whale to Vestmannaeyjar, Iceland, a  runway, and suffered a landing gear failure during landing. There were no injuries, but the landing gear sustained major damage. After receiving temporary repairs, it flew to a nearby city for further repairs.
 On 10 December 2003, a USAF C-17 (AF Serial No. 98-0057) was hit by a surface-to-air missile after take-off from Baghdad, Iraq. One engine was disabled and the aircraft returned for a safe landing. It was repaired and returned to service.
 On 6 August 2005, a USAF C-17 (AF Serial No. 01-0196) ran off the runway at Bagram Air Base in Afghanistan while attempting to land, destroying its nose and main landing gear. After two months making it flightworthy, a test pilot flew the aircraft to Boeing's Long Beach facility as the temporary repairs imposed performance limitations. In October 2006, it returned to service following repairs.

 On 30 January 2009, a USAF C-17 (AF Serial No. 96-0002 – "Spirit of the Air Force") made a gear-up landing at Bagram Air Base. It was ferried from Bagram AB, making several stops along the way, to Boeing's Long Beach plant for extensive repairs. The USAF Aircraft Accident Investigation Board concluded the cause was the crew's failure to follow the pre-landing checklist and lower the landing gear.
 On 28 July 2010, a USAF C-17 (AF Serial No. 00-0173 – "Spirit of the Aleutians") crashed at Elmendorf Air Force Base, Alaska, while practicing for the 2010 Arctic Thunder Air Show, killing all four aboard. It crashed near a railroad, disrupting rail operations. A military investigation found pilot error caused a stall. This is the C-17's only fatal crash and the only hull-loss incident.
 On 23 January 2012, a USAF C-17 (AF Serial No. 07-7189), assigned to the 437th Airlift Wing, Joint Base Charleston, South Carolina, landed on runway 34R at Forward Operating Base Shank, Afghanistan. The crew did not realize the required stopping distance exceeded the runway's length thus were unable to stop. It came to rest approximately 700 feet from the runway's end upon an embankment, causing major structural damage but no injuries. After 9 months of repairs to make it airworthy, the C-17 flew to Long Beach. It returned to service at a reported cost of $69.4 million.
 On 20 July 2012, a USAF C-17 of the 305th Air Mobility Wing, flying from McGuire AFB, New Jersey to MacDill Air Force Base in Tampa, Florida mistakenly landed at nearby Peter O. Knight Airport, a small municipal field without a control tower. After a few hours, the Globemaster took off from the airport's 3,580-foot runway without incident and made the short trip to MacDill AFB. The mistaken landing followed an extended duration flight from Europe to Southwest Asia to embark military passengers before returning to the U.S. The USAF investigation attributed the incident to fatigue leading to pilot error, as both airfields' main runways share the same magnetic heading and are only a few miles apart along the shore of Tampa Bay.
 On 9 April 2021, USAF C-17 10-0223 suffered a fire in its undercarriage after landing at Charleston AFB following a flight from RAF Mildenhall, United Kingdom. The fire spread to the fuselage before it was extinguished.

Specifications (C-17A)

See also

References

Bibliography

 Bonny, Danny, Barry Fryer and Martyn Swann. AMARC MASDC III, The Aerospace Maintenance and Regeneration Center, Davis-Monthan AFB, AZ, 1997–2005. Surrey, UK: British Aviation Research Group, 2006. .
 Department of Defense. Kosovo/Operation Allied Force After-Action Report, DIANE Publishing; 31 January 2000..
 Gertler, Jeremiah. "Air Force C-17 Aircraft Procurement: Background and Issues for Congress." Congressional Research Service,. DIANE Publishing; 22 December 2009. .
 Kennedy, Betty R. Globemaster III: Acquiring the C-17. McConnell AFB, Kansas: Air Mobility Command Office of History, 2004.
 McLaughlin, Andrew. "Big Mover." Canberra: Australian Aviation (Phantom Media), September 2008.
 Norton, Bill. Boeing C-17 Globemaster III (Warbird Tech, Vol. 30). North Branch, Minnesota: Specialty Press, 2001. .

External links 

 
 USAF C-17 fact sheet
 RCAF CC-177 Globemaster III page
 Full C-17 production list, including manufacturer serial numbers (c/n)

C-1017 Globemaster III
C-017 Globemaster III
1990s United States military transport aircraft
Quadjets
High-wing aircraft
T-tail aircraft
Articles containing video clips
Aircraft first flown in 1991
Military globalization